The 2006 San Marino Grand Prix (formally the Formula 1 Gran Premio Foster's di San Marino 2006) was a Formula One motor race held at the Autodromo Enzo e Dino Ferrari in Imola, Italy on 23 April 2006. The 62-lap race was the fourth round of the 2006 Formula One season, and the 26th running of the San Marino Grand Prix. It was won by Ferrari driver Michael Schumacher, who had started from pole position. It was both his and Ferrari's first win of the season. Championship leader Fernando Alonso finished second for the Renault team, whilst Juan Pablo Montoya completed the podium with third position for McLaren.

As a consequence of the race, Schumacher improved his position in the Drivers' Championship from fourth to second. Alonso lengthened his lead in the standings from 14 to 15 points. Kimi Räikkönen remained in third, 3 points behind Schumacher, whilst his teammate Montoya elevated himself ahead of Button into fifth place as a result of his podium finish. Alonso's Renault teammate, Giancarlo Fisichella, dropped to fourth place but still helped to extend the team's lead to 18 points over McLaren in the Constructors' Championship. Ferrari were then 3 points behind McLaren, on a total of 30 points, 15 more than fourth-placed Honda, and 20 more than fifth-placed BMW Sauber.

It was Schumacher's seventh victory at the San Marino Grand Prix, and his fifth win at Imola in six years. This was the last Formula One race to be held in Imola until the 2020 Emilia Romagna Grand Prix.

Report

Friday drivers
The bottom 6 teams in the 2005 Constructors' Championship and Super Aguri were entitled to run a third car in free practice on Friday. These drivers drove on Friday but did not compete in qualifying or the race. Fabrizio del Monte was set to act as Midland's third driver for this race, but this fell through due to lack of sponsorship.

Qualifying
Michael Schumacher took pole position, and in doing so, broke Ayrton Senna's record of 65 poles.

Race
On the first lap, Alonso passed Barrichello at the Tamburello curve. Like the previous Grand Prix, the race started with an accident, this time in the Villeneuve curve. The Super Aguri team's driver Yuji Ide hit MF1's Christijan Albers, putting the Dutchman's car into a series of rolls that left it upside down. Albers was unhurt and Ide was able to continue after replacing his damaged front wing, although he later retired on lap 23. He was reprimanded by the stewards and warned over his future conduct. This incident also formed part of the evidence that led the FIA to withdraw Ide's superlicence later in the season. The Safety Car was deployed for two laps.

Michael Schumacher appeared to have a clear lead coming up to the first set of pit stops, although things started to go wrong after that. His car developed graining in its tyres, which slowed him down considerably. Alonso gained significantly on Schumacher, but could not pass him. The Imola circuit is renowned for being difficult to overtake on.

The race continued normally for some laps, until Toyota driver Jarno Trulli entered the pits to retire following a steering problem. Tonio Liuzzi had a problem and spun his Toro Rosso car in the Variante Alta, a corner which had recently been revised.

Honda driver Rubens Barrichello started the first round of pit stops, on lap 14. His stop lasted 15 seconds, which dropped him to 13th place. Michael Schumacher came into the pits on lap 20, temporarily giving Renault's Fernando Alonso the lead.

Lap 30 saw Honda's Jenson Button make his second stop. The refuelling nozzle got stuck and Button, thinking it had been removed, pulled away from the pits, tearing the nozzle from the refuelling rig. He was delayed in the pitlane while the Honda mechanics removed the nozzle from his car.

By the halfway point of the race, Ferrari began experiencing problems, specifically tyre degradation. Eight laps were enough for Alonso to bring down the 10 second difference between himself and Schumacher. The duel that took place during the 2005 San Marino Grand Prix was to be repeated, this time with Schumacher in the lead.

Lap 41 saw Alonso pit for a second time, ahead of Schumacher. Alonso's out lap was not good enough to put himself in front of Schumacher, so their positions remained the same. Alonso chased hard, but a mistake by running wide into a corner left Schumacher a clear path for the last few laps to win. Meanwhile, David Coulthard had a driveshaft problem and retired on lap 47.

Classification

Qualifying

Race

Championship standings after the race

Drivers' Championship standings.

Constructors' Championship standings

 Note: Only the top five positions are included for both sets of standings.

See also 
 2006 San Marino GP2 Series round

References

External links
Detailed San Marino Grand Prix results (archived)

San Marino Grand Prix
San Marino Grand Prix
San Marino Grand Prix
Grand Prix
April 2006 sports events in Europe